The 2015–16 Colgate Raiders men's basketball team represented Colgate University during the 2015–16 NCAA Division I men's basketball season. The Raiders, led by fifth year head coach Matt Langel, played their home games at Cotterell Court and were members of the Patriot League. They finished the season 13–17, 9–9 in Patriot League play to finish in four way tie for fourth place. They lost in the quarterfinals of the Patriot League tournament to Army.

Previous season
The Raiders finished the season 16–17, 12–6 in Patriot League play to finish in second place. They defeated Navy to advance to the semifinals of the Patriot League tournament where they lost to American.

Departures

Incoming recruits

2016 class recruits

Roster

Schedule

|-
!colspan=9 style="background:#800000; color:#FFFFFF;"| Exhibition

|-
!colspan=9 style="background:#800000; color:#FFFFFF;"| Non-conference regular season

|-
!colspan=9 style="background:#800000; color:#FFFFFF;"| Patriot League regular season

|-
!colspan=9 style="background:#800000; color:#FFFFFF;"| Patriot League tournament

References

Colgate Raiders men's basketball seasons
Colgate
Colgate
Colgate